Ismar Biogradlić (born 5 April 1974) is a Bosnian luger. He competed for Yugoslavia at the 1992 Winter Olympics and for Bosnia and Herzegovina at the 1998 Winter Olympics.

References

1974 births
Living people
Bosnia and Herzegovina male lugers
Olympic lugers of Yugoslavia
Olympic lugers of Bosnia and Herzegovina
Lugers at the 1992 Winter Olympics
Lugers at the 1998 Winter Olympics
Place of birth missing (living people)